Mukim Kota Batu is a mukim in Brunei-Muara District, Brunei. The population was 12,935 in 2016. The mukim is home to some of the country's museums and historical sites, in particular in Kota Batu.

Geography 
The mukim is located on the southeastern part of the Brunei-Muara District, bordering Mukim Mentiri to the north and Mukim Lumapas to the south and west,  Mukim Kianggeh and the mukims within Kampong Ayer to the west, as well as the Brunei Bay to the east and Limbang District in Sarawak, Malaysia, to the east.

The Brunei River flows through the mukim into the Brunei Bay. There are several islands:
 
 
 
 
 
 
 Pulau Sibungor

Demographics 
As of 2016 census, the population was 12,935 with  males and  females. The mukim had 2,188 households occupying 2,177 dwellings. Among the population,  lived in urban areas, while the remainder of  lived in rural areas.

Villages 
As of 2016, the mukim comprised the following census villages:

A few of the villages are also part of Bandar Seri Begawan municipal area, namely Kampong Belimbing, Kampong Kota Batu, Kampong Pelambayan, Kampong Pintu Malim, Kampong Subok and Kampong Sungai Lampai.

Facilities

Mosques 
The current mosques in the mukim include:
 Kampong Pintu Malim Mosque
 Kampong Serdang Mosque
 Kampong Sungai Besar Mosque

It had been inaugurated in September 1958. As of today, the mosque no longer exists.

References 

Kota Batu
Brunei-Muara District